Agnel Lake is a lake at Ceresole Reale in the Province of Turin, Piedmont, Italy, near the Nivolet Pass. The reservoir on the Orco river is located at an elevation of 2300 m, close to Serrù Lake.

Lakes of Piedmont